Horace Martin (born 7 May 1985) is a Jamaican-Dutch kickboxer. He is two times W.A.K.O. Pro and W.F.C.A. world champion.

Titles
 2014 W.F.C.A. Thaiboxing World Champion -95 kg 
 2012 Troyes Trophy Tournament Champion -91 kg 
 2013 W.A.K.O. Pro K-1 Rules Cruiser Light Heavyweight World Champion -85.1 kg  (1 Title Def.)
 2010 Fight Night Merseburg K-1 Rules Tournament Champion

Kickboxing record

|- 
|-  style="background:#cfc;"
| 2017-10-29 || Win ||align=left| Fred Sikking || WFL: Manhoef vs. Bonjasky, Final 16  || Almere, Netherlands || Decision Overturned || 3 || 3:00
|-
|-  style="background:#fbb;"
| 2015-06-13 || Loss ||align=left| Bogdan Stoica || SUPERKOMBAT Special Edition || Spreitenbach, Switzerland || TKO (referee stoppage) || 2 || 2:44 
|-
! style=background:white colspan=9 |
|-  style="background:#cfc;"
| 2015-04-19 || Win ||align=left| Fred Sikking  || The Best of all Elements || Almere, Netherlands || Decision || 3 || 3:00
|-  style="background:#cfc;"
| 2014-04-21 || Win ||align=left| Jegish Yegoian  || Born 2 Fight || Elst, Netherlands || KO || 2 || 
|-
! style=background:white colspan=9 |
|-  style="background:#cfc;"
| 2013-03-09 || Win ||align=left| Yassine Ahaggan  || Monte Carlo Fighting Masters || Monte Carlo, Monaco || KO || 2 || 
|-
! style=background:white colspan=9 |
|-  style="background:#cfc;"
| 2012-12-01 || Win||align=left| Hicham El Gaoui || Fighters Heart  || Arnhem, Netherlands || TKO (Doc. Stop.) ||  || 
|-  style="background:#cfc;"
| 2012-02-18 || Win ||align=left| Emmanuel Payet || K-1 Event 3, Final || Troyes, France || TKO || 3 || 
|-
! style=background:white colspan=9 |
|-  style="background:#cfc;"
| 2012-02-18 || Win ||align=left| Aristote Quitusisa || K-1 Event 3, Semi Finals || Troyes, France || Decision || 3 ||3:00 
|-  style="background:#cfc;"
| 2011-05-14 || Win ||align=left| Andrei Manzolo || Fight Night  || Tallinn, Estonia || KO (Kneeto the Head) || 1 || 
|-
! style=background:white colspan=9 |
|-  style="background:#cfc;"
| 2011-04-25 || Win ||align=left| Samir al Mansouri || Born 2 Fight VI || Westervoort, Netherlands || TKO (Doctor Stop.) || 2 || 
|-  style="background:#cfc;"
| 2011-02-26 || Win ||align=left| Ali Cenik || Kickbox Gala Golden Glory Helmond || Eindhoven, Netherlands || Decision || 3 || 3:00
|-  style="background:#cfc;"
| 2010-08-29 || Win ||align=left| Jan Reimann || 3. Fight Night Merseburg, Semi Finals  || Merseburg, Germany || TKO || 1 || 3:00 
|-
! style=background:white colspan=9 |
|-  style="background:#cfc;"
| 2010-08-29 || Win ||align=left| Dimitar Iliev || 3. Fight Night Merseburg, Quarter Finals  || Merseburg, Germany || Ext. R. Decision || 4 || 3:00 
|-  style="background:#fbb;"
| 2010-04-05 || Loss ||align=left| Hakan Aksoy || Born 2 Fight || Westervoort, Netherlands || Decision || 5 || 3:00
|-
! style=background:white colspan=9 |
|-  style="background:#fbb;"
| 2010-03-19 || Loss ||align=left| Dzianis Hancharonak || K-1 World Max 2010 || Minsk, Belarus || KO || 1 || 1:20
|-  style="background:#fbb;"
| 2009-10-17 || Loss ||align=left| Ville Aalto || Fight Festival 26 || Helsinki, Finland || TKO (Cut) || 2 ||
|-  style="background:#cfc;"
| 2009-08-01 || Win ||align=left| Selim Öztürk || Ergen Ring Ateşi 7  || Turkey ||  ||  || 
|-
| colspan=9 | Legend:

See also
 List of male kickboxers
 List of male mixed martial artists
 List of It's Showtime events

References

1985 births
Living people
Dutch male kickboxers
Jamaican male kickboxers
Light heavyweight kickboxers
SUPERKOMBAT kickboxers